Babajide "Baba" Collins Babatunde (born 2 December 1988) is a Nigerian former professional footballer who played as a forward.

Career
Collins began his career by FC Ebedei played there between 2006, joined then to Ikast FS. Collins played there in their reserve and was 2007 scouted from FC Midtjylland, on 15 January 2009 was loaned to Vejle Boldklub for six months also 30 June 2009.

In January 2011, Collins ended his loan deal with FC Alania Vladikavkaz to join FC Dacia Chişinău on loan.

Collins had a spell with Kazakh club Ordabasy from 2011 to 2013. He returned to Denmark when his contract expired, and trained with AC Horsens in July 2014 and lower league club Ringkøbing IF in August 2014. He himself approached Ringkøbing's coach Kim Kristensen, who had given Collins permission to train with the first team. Collins stated: "I am not desperate to get a deal in Ringkøbing. I've just heard good things about the club and now I'm trying to see it for myself. I do not play for the money anymore. I just want to play some football. If it does not work out, I may go to the United States, where my wife and child are with some friends, or I may return to Africa."

External links
 
  FC Midtjylland profile
  Vejle Boldklub profile

References

Living people
1988 births
Sportspeople from Lagos
Yoruba sportspeople
Nigerian footballers
Association football forwards
F.C. Ebedei players
Vejle Boldklub players
FC Midtjylland players
Ikast FS players
FC Spartak Vladikavkaz players
FC Ordabasy players
Danish Superliga players
Russian Premier League players
Kazakhstan Premier League players
Nigerian expatriate footballers
Nigerian expatriate sportspeople in Denmark
Expatriate men's footballers in Denmark
Nigerian expatriate sportspeople in Russia
Expatriate footballers in Russia
Nigerian expatriate sportspeople in Moldova
Expatriate footballers in Moldova
Nigerian expatriate sportspeople in Kazakhstan
Expatriate footballers in Kazakhstan